The Laws (Greek: Νόμοι, Nómoi; Latin: De Legibus) is Plato's last and longest dialogue.  The conversation depicted in the work's twelve books begins with the question of who is given the credit for establishing a civilization's laws. Its musings on the ethics of government and law have established it as a classic of political philosophy alongside Plato's more widely read Republic.

Scholars generally agree that Plato wrote this dialogue as an older man, having failed in his effort to guide the rule of the tyrant Dionysius I of Syracuse, instead having been thrown in prison. These events are alluded to in the Seventh Letter.  The text is noteworthy as Plato's only undisputed dialogue not to feature Socrates.

Summary

Setting 
Unlike most of Plato's dialogues, Socrates does not appear in the Laws: the dialogue takes place on the island of Crete, and Socrates appears outside of Athens in Plato's writings only twice, in the Phaedrus, where he is just outside the city's walls, and in the Republic, where he goes down to the seaport Piraeus five miles outside of Athens. The conversation is instead led by an Athenian Stranger and two other old men, the ordinary Spartan citizen Megillos and Cleinias of Crete, from Knossos.

The Athenian Stranger, who resembles Socrates but whose name is never mentioned, joins the other two on their religious pilgrimage from Knossos to the cave of Zeus. The entire dialogue takes place during this journey, which mimics the action of Minos: said by the Cretans to have made their ancient laws, Minos walked this path every nine years in order to receive instruction from Zeus on lawgiving. It is also said to be the longest day of the year, allowing for the densely packed twelve chapters.

By the end of the third book Cleinias announces that he has in fact been given the responsibility of creating the laws for a new Cretan colony, and that he would like the Athenian stranger's assistance. The rest of the dialogue proceeds with the three old men, walking towards the cave and making laws for this new city which is called the city of the Magnetes (or Magnesia).

Topics 
The question asked at the beginning is not "What is law?" as one would expect. That is the question of the apocryphal Platonic dialogue Minos. The dialogue rather proceeds from the question, "who it is that receives credit for creating laws."

The questions of the Laws are quite numerous, including:
Divine revelation, divine law and law-giving
The role of intelligence in law-giving
The relations of philosophy, religion, and politics
The role of music, exercise and dance in education
Natural law and natural right

The dialogue uses primarily the Athenian and Spartan (Lacedaemonian) law systems as background for pinpointing a choice of laws, which the speakers imagine as a more or less coherent set for the new city they are talking about.

The tenth book of the Laws most famously discusses the priority of soul: both explanatory priority and ontological priority. Plato here refutes the views of his predecessors who argued that soul (and what soul is related to, such as intelligence, knowledge, skill, etc.) is posterior to corporeal things such as earth and fire. The natural philosophers had explained soul, intelligence, and so on, in terms of corporeal things: corporeal things exist first and give rise to psychic phenomena. In contrast, Plato argues that soul is first, both as that in terms of which corporeal things ought to be explained and as that which gives rise to the corporeal world. Plato concludes this by relying on his view that the soul is intelligent and a self-mover and that soul is that which supervises the cosmos. There is an important scholarly discussion of whether Plato means to allow for there to be an evil soul governing the cosmos, alongside a virtuous soul. Gabriela Carone, for instance, maintains that Plato "does not dismiss the existence of a kind of evil soul as such." But more-recent scholarship has argued otherwise. In general, recent scholars have understood Plato's psychology to be such that souls are by their very nature intelligent (for it is by means of their intelligence that they move things), and that Plato's view of intelligence requires that intelligent things not be vicious; this rules out the very possibility of an evil soul.

Comparison with Plato's Republic
The Laws, like the earlier Republic, concerns the making of a city in speech.  Yet it is in opposition to the earlier dialogue, and the constitution of the hypothetical Magnesia described in the Laws differs from that of Kallipolis described in the Republic, on several key points. The city of the Laws differs in its allowance of private property and private families, and in the very existence of written laws, from the city of the Republic, with its property-system and community of wives for the guardians, and absence of written law. 

Also, whereas the Republic is a dialogue between Socrates and several young men, the Laws is a discussion among three old men contriving a device for reproductive law, with a view of hiding from virile youth their rhetorical strategy of piety, rituals and virtue.

The city of the Laws is described as "second best" not because the city of the Republic is the best, but because it is the city of gods and their children.

Traditionally, the Minos is thought to be the preface, and the Epinomis the epilogue, to the Laws, but these are generally considered by scholars to be spurious.

Comparisons to other works on Greek law 
Plato was not the only Ancient Greek author writing about the law systems of his day, and making comparisons between the Athenian and the Spartan laws.  Notably, the Constitution of the Spartans by Xenophon, the Constitution of the Athenians, wrongly attributed to Xenophon, and the Constitution of the Athenians, possibly by Aristotle or one of his students, have also survived.

Some centuries later Plutarch would also devote attention to the topic of Ancient Greek law systems, e.g. in his Life of Lycurgus. Lycurgus was the legendary law-giver of the Lacedaemonians. Plutarch compares Lycurgus and his Spartan laws to the law system Numa Pompilius introduced in Rome around 700 BC.

Both pseudo-Xenophon and Plutarch are stark admirers of the Spartan system, showing less reserve than Plato in expressing that admiration.

Manuscripts 

Papyrus Oxyrhynchus 23

Published editions 

 (Greek text only)
 (literal translation) Also available in audio.
 (nonliteral translation) Also available via Project Gutenberg
 (Greek text only, no English translation)
 (Greek and English text parallel) Volume 1, Volume 2

See also
Gymnasium
Gymnopaedia
Highly composite number
Mixed government

References

Further reading

Domanski, Andrew. (2007). "Principles of Early Education in Plato's 'Laws'." Acta Classica 50: 65–80.
Folch, Marcus. (2015). The City and the Stage: Performance, Genre, and Gender in Plato's Laws. Oxford: Oxford Univ. Press.
Hunter, Virginia. (2009). "Crime and Criminals in Plato's Laws." Mouseion 9.1: 1–19.

Klosko, George. (2006). The Development of Plato’s Political Theory. 2d ed. Oxford: Oxford Univ. Press.

Levin, S. B. (2000). "Plato on Women’s Nature: Reflections on the Laws." Ancient Philosophy 20.1: 81–97.

Menn, Stephen. 1995. Plato on God as Nous. Carbondale: Southern Illinois Univ. Press.
Morrow, G. R. 1960. Plato’s Cretan City: A Historical Interpretation of the Laws. Princeton, NJ: Princeton Univ. Press.
Pangle, Thomas L. (1980). The Laws of Plato, Translated, with Notes and an Interpretive Essay. New York: Basic Books.
Peponi, A. E. ed. (2013). Performance and Culture in Plato’s Laws. Cambridge, UK: Cambridge Univ. Press.
Prauscello, Lucia. (2014). Performing Citizenship in Plato’s Laws. Cambridge, UK: Cambridge Univ. Press.

 Samaras, Thanassis. 2012. "Leisured Aristocrats or Warrior-Farmers? Leisure in Plato’s Laws." Classical Philology 107.1: 1–20.
Stalley, R. F. (1983). An Introduction to Plato’s Laws. Oxford: Blackwell.

External links

 
 
Other ancient texts about law systems
{{gutenberg|no=1178|name=Polity of the Athenians and the Lacedaemonians by Xenophon}}
 (Life of Lycurgus is in Volume I of the Lives'')

Ancient Greek law
Dialogues of Plato
Philosophy of law
Political philosophy in ancient Greece